Luigi Giuliano (16 August 1930 – 23 December 1993) was an Italian professional footballer who played as a midfielder.

Club career
He had the distinction of scoring in each of his first three Serie A games in the 1948/49 season. He was the only youth team player who was playing regularly on the first squad of A.C. Torino. Because of a delay he had in obtaining a passport he did not join the team on its trip to Lisbon which led to the Superga air disaster, in which the first squad perished.

His last two seasons with A.S. Roma were hampered by serious knee injuries, but that did not stop him from playing on the team that won the 1960–61 Inter-Cities Fairs Cup; he scored a goal in the competition against Union Saint-Gilloise and played in the final. Overall, he played for 14 seasons in the Serie A for A.C. Torino and A.S. Roma (267 games, 21 goals).

International career
He played his only game for the Italy national football team on 27 November 1955 against Hungary.

External links
 

1930 births
1993 deaths
People from Vercelli
Italian footballers
Serie A players
Serie B players
F.C. Pro Vercelli 1892 players
Torino F.C. players
A.S. Roma players
Italy international footballers
Association football midfielders